Amantis aliena is a species of praying mantis native to Amboina, Sumatra, Malaysia, Moluccas, and Myanmar.

References

irina
Mantodea of Southeast Asia
Insects of Indonesia
Insects of Malaysia
Insects of Myanmar
Fauna of Sumatra
Insects described in 1870